Branch of saphenous nerve may refer to:

 Infrapatellar branch of saphenous nerve
 Medial crural cutaneous branches of saphenous nerve